Pendleton County Schools is the operating school district within Pendleton County, West Virginia. It is governed by the Pendleton County Board of Education.

Schools

Secondary School
Pendleton County Middle/High School

Elementary Schools
Brandywine Elementary School 
Franklin Elementary School 
North Fork Elementary School

Former Schools
Circleville High School
Franklin High School
Seneca Rocks Elementary School
Upper Tract Elementary School

References

External links
Pendleton County Schools

School districts in West Virginia
Education in Pendleton County, West Virginia